Vera Causa is a two-disc collection of demos, live and rare tracks by Faith and the Muse.

Track listing

The Night
Live In Heaven:
"Cantus"
"Scars Flown Proud"
"Sparks"
"The Silver Circle"
"All lovers Lost/Arianrhod"
"The Unquiet Grave"
"Annwyn, Beneath the Waves" Remixes:
"Elyria"  (Toby Dammit mix) by Full Fathom Five/The Trace (band)
"Mercyground"  (Rhea's Obsession mix) by Jim Field
"The Silver Circle"  (Gears and Teeth mix) by Statik/Collide
"Shattered In Aspect"  (bassX_rmX) by Thomas Rainer/L'ame Immortelle
"The Sea Angler"  (Vast Ocean mix) by Kevin Kipnis/Purr Machine
"Scars Flown Proud"  (Hong Kong Hotel mix) by Rodney Orpheus/The Cassandra Complex
"Porphyrogene"  (Laboratory X Version) by Chad Blinman/Laboratory X

The Morning
Compilation Appearances, Covers, Acoustic Versions & Rarities:
"Frater Ave Atque Vale"
"In Dreams of Mine"
"Running Up That Hill" — Kate Bush
"Patience Worth" (piano version)
"Hollow Hills" — Bauhaus
"Soul In Isolation" — The Chameleons (live)
"The Breath of a Kiss" (demo)
"Muted Land"
"Annwyn, Beneath the Waves" (acoustic)
"A Winter Wassail"
"Romeo's Distress" — Christian Death (live)
"Drown" — Strange Boutique (acoustic)
"All Lovers Lost" (demo)
"Heal" (original demo)

Credits
Booklet Text Compiled by Ginger Collins
Back Traycard photo by Sabine Eichmann
Back Booklet Cover photo by E. Katie Holm
Cover painting & Graphic design by Monica Richards
Mastered by Ramon Breton at Ocean View Digital Mastering, West Los Angeles, California

All titles written by Faith and the Muse except
Cover songs/Frater lyrics - p Metropolis Records 2001

Night
Live tracks recorded April 2000 in Leipzig, Germany and Gent, Belgium
Live Musicians:
Kenton Holmes: guitars, keyboards & percussion
Monica Richards: vocals & recorder
Cynthia Coulter: bass guitar, hammered dulcimer, violin & percussion
Jeremy George: percussion & keyboards
Stevyn Grey: drums & percussion
William Faith: guitars, cello, mandolin, percussion & vocals
Live Recording by Chad Blinman
Mixed by William Faith at Wisperthal, Los Angeles,
Thanks to Raif Jurgens for live sound on the European shows, Patty Hele and Mother Dance, Sabine Eichmann, Brian Necro, Wayne Hays, Clovis IV and Grant George

Morning
Covers:

"Running Up That Hill"
Guest Drummers: Stevyn Grey and Jeremy George
Recorded February, 2001 at Audio International- Ojai, California
Produced by Faith and the Muse
Recorded by Chad Blinman Mixed by William Faith
© Kate Bush - Kate Bush Music Ltd.

"Hollow Hills"
Recorded August, 1993
at New American Sound - Santa Barbara, CA
Produced by F&TM • Recorded and Mixed by Mark Casselman
© Bauhaus - Beggars Banquet Music Ltd.

"Soul In Isolation" (live)
© The Chameleons - Man-Ken Music Ltd. (BMI)

"Romeo's Distress" (live)
© Christian Death - American Lesion Music/Artshow Noises (BMI)

"Drown"
Guest Guitarist: Frederick E. Smith Jr
Recorded July, 2001 at Wisperthal - Los Angeles, CA
Produced by Faith and the Muse
Recorded and Mixed by William Faith
© Strange Boutique - Copyright Control

References 

Faith and the Muse albums
2001 compilation albums